Hemhem crown was an ancient Egyptian ceremonial headgear, in the form of an ornate triple atef with corkscrew sheep horns and usually two uraei. The Egyptian word "hemhem" means "to shout", "cry out", possibly indicating that the hemhem crown represented a battle horn.

An early use of the hemhem crown is shown on the golden throne of 18th Dynasty Pharaoh Tutankhamun. Later the hemhem crown was shown on the images of non-Egyptian rulers, such as Nubians Natakamani, Arnekhamani or Silko of Nobadia. Cyrus the Great is seen wearing the crown in a bas-relief found in Pasargadae.

Description 
The hemhem crown is a more elaborate version of the atef crown; because of this, it was sometimes referred as the Triple Atef Crown. Heka the god of magic was illustrated wearing the hemhem crown. The crown is connected to the rising of the sun, which is interpreted as ‘rebirth’ and it is often seen in hieroglyphs with a solar child inside a lotus flower. This crown became known during the Ptolemaic period.

History 
The hemhem crown originated in the 18th Dynasty, and was worn during significant ceremonies. The symbolic interpretation behind this crown was to boast the power of the Pharaoh. Also, the crown was worn during warfare – this was signified by the meaning of hemhem as 'scream' – but it was worn during many festivals as well.  It was also used in the ritual crowning of the new king, which was done by two gods. However, the first noted appearance of the hemhem crown was during the reign of Akhenaten and then discovered in the tomb of Amarna. A young king named Tutankhamen wore the crown in a different manner; he would place the crown on the back of the throne.  This was also discovered in his tomb.

Features 
The crown is set on top of a pair of long spiral ram's horns, and it is commonly seen with a cobra on either side of the crown. It was created with reeds and ostrich feathers, along with feathers from many other birds. The hemhem was the Triple Rush Crown, and was worn tilted towards the back of the head – contrary to how crowns are normally worn. Another type of hemhem crown has three falcon birds in place of the three sun disks. This type of crown signifies the reign over Lower Egypt; the combination of the sun disks and the falcon shows the power over Lower Egypt along with Upper Egypt. The hemhem crowns occur more frequently from the time of Ptolemy VI onwards. The symbols on the crown, such as reeds and uraeuses signify a later time period. The more intricate the carvings on the crown, the later the time period of the crown. Falcons and horn imagery are not part of the early Ptolemaic period and are rarely depicted in hieroglyphs during that time period. Many other features of the crown, such as feathers from different animals, are all found in different time periods. Each feather added on the hemhem crown has significance to its time period. The form of the crown was constantly changing according to the time period; different items would be added on or taken off, or the shape of the crown would change. The crown was often depicted along with the nemes – the striped headcloth – and just as each time period had its significance, so did the collaboration of the nemes and the hemhem crown.

References 

Crowns (headgear)
Ancient Egyptian culture